The 2009 Soul Train Music Awards were held at the Georgia World Congress Center in Atlanta, Georgia on November 29, 2009. The show was hosted by Oscar nominated actor Terrence Howard and  Oscar nominated actress Taraji P. Henson. Performers included Keri Hilson, Toni Braxton, Trey Songz, Mario, Raheem DeVaughn, Ludacris, Ryan Leslie, and Robin Thicke.

Singers Chaka Khan and Charlie Wilson received the honoree Soul Train Legend Award.
Michael Jackson was honoree for posthumous award for Entertainer of the Year. Beyoncé won three awards; Best Female Artist, Song of the Year, and Album of the Year. LeToya served as host for the Red-Carpet Show.

Special awards

Entertainer of the Year (Posthumous Honor)
 Michael Jackson

Legend Award – Female
 Chaka Khan

Legend Award – Male
 Charlie Wilson

Winners and nominees

Album of the Year
 Beyoncé – I Am... Sasha Fierce
 Jamie Foxx – Intuition
 Maxwell – Blacksummers'night
 Ne-Yo – Year of the Gentleman
 Kanye West – 808s & Heartbreak

Song of the Year
 Beyoncé – "Single Ladies (Put a Ring on It)"
 Keri Hilson  – "Turnin Me On"
 Jennifer Hudson – "Spotlight"
 Mary Mary – "God in Me"
 Maxwell – "Pretty Wings"

The Ashford & Simpson Songwriter's Award
 Jamie Foxx  – "Blame It"
 Written by: Christopher "Deep" Henderson, Nate Walker, James T. Brown, John Conte Jr., David Ballard and Brandon Melanchon
 Beyoncé – "Single Ladies (Put a Ring on It)"
 Written by: Christopher Stewart, Terius Nash, Thaddis Harrell and Beyoncé Knowles
 Drake – "Best I Ever Had"
 Written by: Aubrey Graham, Danny Hamilton, Dwayne Carter, Matthew Samuels and Nakia Coleman
 Keri Hilson  – "Knock You Down"
 Written by: Nate Hills, Keri Hilson, Kevin Cossom, Shaffer Smith, Marcella Araica and Kanye West
 Maxwell – "Pretty Wings"
 Written by: Gerald Rivera and Hod David

Best Male R&B/Soul Artist
 Maxwell
 Raphael Saadiq
 Musiq Soulchild
 Robin Thicke
 Charlie Wilson

Best Female R&B/Soul Artist
 Beyoncé
 Whitney Houston
 Jennifer Hudson
 Ledisi
 Chrisette Michele

Best New Artist
 Keri Hilson
 Drake
 Ryan Leslie
 Solange
 Jazmine Sullivan

Best Reggae Artist
 Sean Paul
 Ziggy Marley
 Mavado
 Tarrus Riley
 Serani

CENTRIC Award
 Maysa
 Corneille
 Laura Izibor
 The Knux
 Eric Roberson

Best Gospel Performance – Male, Female or Group
 Mary Mary – "God in Me"
 Fred Hammond  – "They That Wait"
 Smokie Norful – "Justified"
 Marvin Sapp – "Praise Him in Advance"
 BeBe & CeCe Winans – "Close to You"

Best Collaboration
 Keri Hilson  – "Knock You Down"
 Keyshia Cole  – "Trust"
 Mario  – "Break Up"
 Mary Mary  – "God in Me"
 Trey Songz  – "Successful"

Performers
 Chrisette Michele
 Keri Hilson
 Mario and Sean Garrett
 Raheem DeVaughn and Ludacris
 Robin Thicke
 Ryan Leslie
 Toni Braxton and Trey Songz

Tribute performances
 Charlie Wilson Legend Tribute
 K-Ci & JoJo
 Raheem DeVaughn

 Chaka Khan Legend Tribute
 Angie Stone
 Erykah Badu
 Fantasia
 Ledisi
 Melle Mel

 Motown Musical Moment
 Boyz II Men
 Chico DeBarge
 Estelle
 Hal Linton
 Henson
 Johnny Gill
 Melanie Fiona
 Mike Phillips
 Vita

Telecast
The Soul Train Awards aired on BET and Centric on November 29, 2009. It was also broadcast on BET UK.

Trivia
The Soul Train Awards was a trending topic during its time on-air on the social media site, Twitter.

The Soul Train trophy, originally the trademark African ceremonial mask (Soul Train Music Award for Heritage Award – Career Achievement) is replaced with an actual train.

In an episode of Community, "Social Psychology", character Troy mentions the Soul Train Awards when complaining about participating in a study that never begins.

See also
 Soul Train Awards

Notes

External links
 BET Official website

Soul Train Music Awards
Soul
Soul
Soul
Soul